Olli Tyrväinen (born 11 January 1960) is a former international speedway rider from Finland.

Speedway career
Tyrväinen reached the final of the Speedway World Championship in the 1989 Individual Speedway World Championship.

He rode in the top tier of British Speedway from 1981-1992, riding for various clubs.

He has twice won the silver medal and twice won the bronze medal in the Finnish Individual Speedway Championship.

World final appearances

Individual World Championship
 1989 -  Munich, Olympic Stadium - 13th - 4pts

World Pairs Championship
 1989 -  Leszno, Alfred Smoczyk Stadium (with Kai Niemi) - 5th - 31pts
 1990 -  Landshut, Ellermühle Stadium (with Kai Niemi) - 5th - 31pts

References

1960 births
Living people
Finnish speedway riders
Bradford Dukes riders
Eastbourne Eagles riders
Sheffield Tigers riders
People from Varkaus
Sportspeople from North Savo